Cheadle Hulme North is an electoral ward in the Metropolitan Borough of Stockport. It elects three Councillors to Stockport Metropolitan Borough Council using the first past the post electoral method, electing one Councillor every year without election on the fourth. There were no local elections in 2020 due to the COVID-19 pandemic, so the fourth year of no elections (due in 2021) was effectively swapped with the third year (2020). 

The ward is represented in Westminster by Mary Robinson MP for Cheadle.

The M60 Manchester Ring Road crosses the northern part of the ward.

Councillors
The ward is represented on Stockport Council by three councillors: David Meller (Labour), Tom Morrison (Lib Dem), and Jilly Julian (Lib Dem).

 indicates seat up for re-election.

Elections in the 2020s

May 2022

May 2021

Elections in the 2010s

May 2019

May 2018

May 2016

May 2015

May 2014

May 2012

May 2011

References

External links
Stockport Metropolitan Borough Council

Wards of the Metropolitan Borough of Stockport
Cheadle Hulme